Mary Jordan may refer to:

 Mary Augusta Jordan (1855–1941), American professor of English studies
 Mary Ranken Jordan (1869–1962), American philanthropist
 Mary Jordan (journalist) (born 1960), American journalist and Pulitzer Prize winner
 Mary Jordan (filmmaker) (born 1969), American filmmaker, artist, activist and social justice advocate
 Mariangela Giordano (born 1937), Italian actress (English pseudonyme)